List of airports in Åland, sorted by location.



List

See also 
 List of airports in Finland
 Transport in Åland
 Wikipedia: Airline destination lists: Europe#Åland
 List of the largest airports in the Nordic countries

External links 
Mariehamn airport
Kumlinge at lentopaikat.net 

Aland
Airports
Aland